The 42nd Indonesian Film Festival ceremony, presented by Indonesian Film Board and Ministry of Education, Culture, Research, and Technology, honored the achievement in Indonesian cinema released from 1 September 2021 to 31 August 2022. The ceremony was held on 22 November 2022 at the Jakarta Convention Center, Jakarta, Indonesia, and presented by actresses Cut Mini, Marsha Timothy, Prilly Latuconsina and Shenina Cinnamon.

Drama film Before, Now & Then and action film Vengeance Is Mine, All Others Pay Cash won five awards each, the former was awarded Best Picture. Other winners included Satan's Slaves 2: Communion with two, Autobiography, Backstage, Blackout, Dancing Colors, First, Second & Third Love, Gimbal: A Bet Between Tradition and Pride, Ininnawa: An Island Calling, Kadet 1947 and Losmen Bu Broto with one.

Winners and nominees

The nominations were announced on 22 October 2022 and broadcast live from Borobudur, Central Java. The nominations were led by Vengeance Is Mine, All Others Pay Cash with twelve, Before, Now & Then followed with eleven and Stealing Raden Saleh with nine.

Awards
Winners are listed first, highlighted in boldface, and indicated with a double dagger (‡).

Audience Awards

Films with multiple nominations and awards

References

External links

Citra Awards
Indonesian